Jacoby Dakota Shaddix (born July 28, 1976) is an American singer, songwriter, rapper, and TV presenter. He is best known as the founding member and the continuous lead singer of the California-based rock band Papa Roach since the band's formation in 1993.

Shaddix served as the host of the MTV show Scarred for the entirety of the show's cycle, presenting both seasons and all 20 episodes of the show, which spanned from April 10 to September 18, 2007. Shaddix would ultimately leave the show due to touring demands with Papa Roach. The name of the show was based on the Papa Roach song "Scars".

Shaddix is one of the co-owners of a rock-inspired clothing line with designer Jeff Henry called "Lovers Are Lunatics", with the focus being described as "to create a brand that represents the rock community and showcases their unique creative vision".

Music career

Papa Roach (1993–present)

Shaddix is the founding member of Papa Roach. He formed the band with former drummer Dave Buckner, bassist Will James, and guitarist Ben Luther, in 1993. Luther was replaced by current guitarist Jerry Horton, and by 1996 Tobin Esperance had replaced Will James following his departure. In 2007, Dave Buckner's role was filled by Tony Palermo, leaving Jacoby as the only original member in the band. The band's name, Papa Roach, derives from Shaddix's step-grandfather, Howard William Roatch, who went by the nickname "Papa Roach". Howard died by suicide in 2006 following a diagnosis of an unspecified form of advanced-stage cancer. The song "Roses on My Grave" was written in his memory. Before releasing their major-label debut album, Infest, Papa Roach recorded and published an EP in 1994 entitled Potatoes For Christmas. In 1997, their first full-length album, entitled Old Friends from Young Years, was released.

Shaddix stopped using rapping as a whole in their 2004 album Getting Away with Murder. In an interview in 2004, Shaddix said that he became disenchanted with hip hop and what it represented in the media and stated that "I just want to be a rocker", also stating in 2009 that it was safe to assume he would not be rapping again. However, in 2012, Shaddix started rapping again in the album The Connection. There were some tracks on their 2017 album Crooked Teeth that featured rapping. In 2021, looked back on his and Papa Roach's association with the nu metal genre, reflecting back that "I love being one of the forefathers of nu metal, that’s dope, but we’ve been able to outlive it and celebrate it at the same time."

On December 13, 2019, Shaddix provided new vocals for a remix of The Hu's "Wolf Totem".

Fight the Sky (2002–2004)

Shaddix performed as the lead singer of a post-hardcore band called Fight the Sky from 2002 to 2004 under the name 'John Doe'. The band was intended as a side project of Shaddix where he could display the heavier side of his vocals. The band's line-up consisted of Shaddix as the lead singer, Wade Khail as the lead guitarist and backing vocalist, Ali Abrishami as the bass guitarist and backing vocalist, and Jay Ingram on the drums and percussion. The band had signed a record deal to Papa Roach's self-owned label El Tonal Records and entered Velvet Tone Studios in Sacramento, California, to record their debut album Seven Deadly Songs between January and February 2004. No public updates have been made regarding either the release date of the album or the future of Fight the Sky.

Personal life
Shaddix currently resides in Sacramento, California, with his wife Kelly (married since 1997) and their three sons: Makaile (born March 24, 2002), Jagger (born September 13, 2004) and Brixton (born September 17, 2013). He has two brothers, named Bryson and Trevor.

Shaddix has stated that in the first year of his life, he and his family were homeless. Shaddix has had problems with alcohol and drug abuse, but has been sober since 2012. Shaddix revealed he was suicidal before getting clean in 2012. He admitted to a partial relapse during the COVID-19 pandemic, as the stress of the pandemic caused him to smoke marijuana. However, after receiving encouragement from friends, he stopped smoking and has been clean since.

Shaddix is a devoted Christian and has been known to sing Christian hymns and songs at public events.

Filmography
 Total Request Live (2000)
  Top of the Pops (2001)
 MTV Bash: Carson Daly (2003)
 Player$ (2003)
 Interaktiv (2004)
 Sarah Kuttner - Die Show (2004)
 The Late Late Show with Craig Kilborn (2004)
 Papa Roach: Live & Murderous In Chicago (2005)
 Scarred (2007)
 The Invited (2010)
 Metal Evolution (2012)
 At Hell's Door: Behind the Scenes at Hellfest (2013)
 Mulatschag (2013)
 Papa Roach: Live from Nokia (2013)
 The Retaliators (2022)

Discography

Papa Roach

 Old Friends from Young Years (1997)
 Infest (2000)
 Lovehatetragedy (2002)
 Getting Away with Murder (2004)
 The Paramour Sessions (2006)
 Metamorphosis (2009)
 Time for Annihilation (2010)
 The Connection (2012)
 F.E.A.R. (2015)
 Crooked Teeth (2017)
 Who Do You Trust? (2019)
 Ego Trip (2022)

Fight the Sky
 Seven Deadly Songs (never released; recorded in 2004)

Other appearances

References

External links

1976 births
People from Vacaville, California
Singer-songwriters from California
American heavy metal singers
American rock songwriters
Living people
Nu metal singers
People from Mariposa, California
People from El Dorado Hills, California
Papa Roach members
21st-century American singers
21st-century American male singers
American male singer-songwriters